Dallas Alonzo Comegys (born August 17, 1964) is an American former professional basketball player.

College career 
Comegys played collegiate basketball for the DePaul Blue Demons in the NCAA Division I from 1983 to 1987.

Professional career 
Comegys was selected by the Atlanta Hawks with the 21st overall pick of the 1987 NBA Draft. 
He was traded to the New Jersey Nets in exchange for a second-round draft choice in either 1989 or 1990.
He played 75 games (17 starts) for the Nets in 1987–88, averaging 5.6 ppg, adding totals of 218 rebounds and 70 blocks.

Comegys was traded to the San Antonio Spurs in exchange for Walter Berry in August 1988.
With the Spurs, he played 67 games (10 starts), with 6.5 points and 3.5	 rebounds on average in 1988–89

He then moved to Europe, playing a good part of his career in Italy, mostly in the second division Serie A2, with some spells in the top tier Serie A.
There he played for Banco di Sardegna Sassari, Fortitudo Bologna, Comerson Siena – with whom he led the Serie A in rebounding in 1995 – and SNAI Montecatini.

Comegys also played in the Spanish Liga ACB for Oximesa Granada, his first experience abroad, in the Turkish Basketball League for Fenerbahçe and Pınar Karşıyaka. During his time at Fenerbahçe he was shot after leaving a nightclub. He later played in the Israeli Basketball Super League for Maccabi Tel Aviv and for various U.S. minor league teams.

References

External links
NBA profile  Retrieved on 10 June 2015
Lega Basket Serie A profile Retrieved on 10 June 2015 
Liga ACB profile Retrieved on 10 June 2015 
RealGM profile Retrieved on 10 June 2015
TBLStat.net profile

1964 births
Living people
20th-century African-American sportspeople
21st-century African-American people
African-American basketball players
All-American college men's basketball players
American expatriate basketball people in Israel
American expatriate basketball people in Italy
American expatriate basketball people in Spain
American expatriate basketball people in Turkey
American men's basketball players
Atlanta Hawks draft picks
Basketball players from Philadelphia
DePaul Blue Demons men's basketball players
Dinamo Sassari players
Fenerbahçe men's basketball players
Fortitudo Pallacanestro Bologna players
Israeli Basketball Premier League players
Karşıyaka basketball players
Lega Basket Serie A players
Liga ACB players
Maccabi Tel Aviv B.C. players
McDonald's High School All-Americans
Mens Sana Basket players
Montecatiniterme Basketball players
New Jersey Nets players
Parade High School All-Americans (boys' basketball)
Power forwards (basketball)
San Antonio Spurs players